Currabinny may refer to:
 Curraghbinny, also spelled Currabinny and Currabinney, a townland in County Cork, Ireland
 Currabinny, a food company founded by James Kavanagh and William Murray